BMX Bandits (released as Short Wave in the United States) is a 1983 Australian crime comedy action film directed by Brian Trenchard-Smith and starring Nicole Kidman.

Plot
After a successful Sydney bank robbery, with the robbers wearing pig masks and wielding shotguns, the man in charge, "The Boss", plans a further and larger payroll robbery for two days later worth at least $1.5 million, hoping that he can trust his less-than-competent gang headed by Whitey and Moustache to do the job properly, with anyone who doesn't answering to him.

Two young BMX experts, P. J. and Goose, meet Judy, who is working as a trolley collector at the Warringah Mall during the school holidays in order to be able to buy her own BMX bike, and accidentally get Judy fired from her job when they crash into trolleys pushed away by the local "Creep". The three go out in Goose's dad's runabout on the harbour searching for cockles to sell in order to fix their own crashed bikes, as well as getting Judy her own, and stumble onto and steal a box of police-band walkie talkies that the bank robbers were hoping to use to monitor on police traffic. After stealing the box, the kids pass Whitey and Moustache who are on their way in their high-powered motorboat to pick it up.

Judy, P.J. and Goose sell the walkie-talkies to other kids in the area. The Bayside Police are able to hear the kids using the walkie talkies. Judy, P.J. and Goose are also unaware that the robbers know who stole the box. After they are spotted and chased late at night through a cemetery by Whitey and Moustache wearing monster masks (going formal, according to Whitey), they manage to escape. The next day, P.J. and Goose pick up their newly repaired bikes while Judy buys her bike. Judy is caught the next day by Whitey and Moustache while getting a second walkie talkie for The Creep, but escapes with the help of P.J. and Goose. The goons chase the Bandits in a cartoonish chase across various sites around Sydney, including a memorable escape down the Manly Waterworks water slides, complete with BMX bikes.

The trio are finally arrested but escape police custody and, with the help of the local kids, launch their own plan to foil the planned payroll robbery. Using the walkie-talkies, the Bandits pinpoint the meeting place for the robbers, then proceed to ambush and apprehend the robbers. The Boss, Whitey and Moustache escape in a removal truck with Judy as a hostage, with P.J. and Goose taking chase. They cause the truck to crash, with police soon arriving to arrest The Boss, Whitey and Moustache.

The police build a BMX track as thanks for the capture. In its opening meeting, the BMX Bandits sweep the main awards.

Cast 

Nicole Kidman as Judy
Angelo D'Angelo as P.J.
James Lugton as Goose
David Argue as Whitey
John Ley as Moustache
Bryan Marshall as The Boss
Brian Sloman as The Creep
Peter Browne as Police Constable
Bill Brady as Police Sergeant
Linda Newton as Policewoman	
Bob Hicks as Heavy #1
Guy Norris as Heavy #2
Chris Hession as Heavy #3
Norman Hodges as The Drunk
Brian Best as Supermarket Manager
Ray Marshall as Foreman
Patrick Mansfield as Crane Operator
De Vuong as BMX Stunt Rider

Filming locations
 Northern Beaches
 Warringah Mall
 Waverley Cemetery, Bronte
 Manly Oval
 Manly Waterworks
 The Corso
 Manly Beach
 Sydney Harbour
 Lane Cove Flour bombing scene

Production
The film was originally going to be written and directed by Russell Hagg, only it was going to be about nine-year old characters. He was unable to raise finance. The project passed to producer Tom Broadbridge who hired Hagg's frequent collaborator Patrick Edgeworth to rewrite the script and make it about teenagers.

Brian Trenchard-Smith was hired after the producers had been impressed by his handling of action in Turkey Shoot. He says the script was originally set in Melbourne but he persuaded them to re-set it in Sydney to take advantage of that city's locations. He set it on the northern beaches and wrote action sequences based on "my concept for the BMX action being putting BMX bikes where BMX bikes aren’t meant to be." The movie was shot over 41 days, a longer than normal shoot because of the labour restrictions caused by the fact many of the cast were under 16. Trenchard-Smith:

I wanted to capture the spirit of the Ealing comedies and British films of the '50s and '60s that were clearly aimed at children and delivered action and fun in a largely cartoonish way. If you look at the basic premise of the plot, the crooks clearly want to or intend to kill the children at some point, so how do you disguise that and make that palatable to an audience of kids and parents? You make the crooks buffoonish, the gang that couldn’t shoot straight, so that takes the curse off the underlying purpose.

Nicole Kidman sprained her ankle during filming. No female stunt double that looked like her could be found, so her bike stunts were performed by an 18-year-old man in a wig.

Awards

Box office
Director Trenchard-Smith states during the Blu-ray commentary that BMX Bandits grossed more than $1 million in its first 6 weeks and was the 5th highest-grossing film in England for the year of its release.
Kidman's performance led to her being cast in the TV series Five Mile Creek where she was directed by Trenchard-Smith in some episodes.

Critical reception
The film was released in the UK. The Guardian wrote: "there's a girl called Nicole Kidman who's rather good".

Home media
BMX Bandits was released on DVD by Umbrella Entertainment in August 2010. The DVD is compatible with all region codes and includes special features such as the trailer and audio commentary with Brian Trenchard-Smith, Eric Trenchard-Smith & Chalet Trenchard-Smith. A bonus disc includes a photo gallery, press clippings, Nicole Kidman discussing the film on Young Talent Time, and a featurette titled BMX Buddies with Brian Trenchard-Smith, Tom Broadbridge, Patrick Edgeworth, Russell Hagg and James Lugton.

In 2013 region free DVD and Blu-ray was released as an updated version which includes all footage and bonus material from previous versions on one disc.

A regular edition was released on DVD by Umbrella Entertainment in January 2012 without the bonus disc.

References in popular culture
American rock band Wheatus has a song titled "BMX Bandits" on their album Too Soon Monsoon. The song has been dedicated to Nicole Kidman, and includes the lyrics "Hey Nicole" in the chorus. In the song's animated music video, there is an animated caricature of Kidman.

The show That Mitchell and Webb Look parodied the film in the recurrent adventures titled "Angel Summoner and BMX Bandit".

The Scottish Indie-rock band BMX Bandits are named after the film.

See also
 Cinema of Australia

References

External links
 
 
BMX Bandits at Oz Movies
 
 BMX Bandits at the National Film and Sound Archive

1983 films
1980s action comedy films
1980s adventure comedy films
1980s action adventure films
1980s crime comedy films
Australian action adventure films
Australian crime comedy films
1980s English-language films
Films directed by Brian Trenchard-Smith
Cycling films
Films set in Sydney
Films shot in Australia
BMX mass media
Australian action comedy films
Australian sports comedy films
Teensploitation
1983 comedy films